The Guyou Islands are a small group of islands lying  northeast of Sonia Point in Flandres Bay, off the west coast of Graham Land, Antarctica. They were first charted by the Belgian Antarctic Expedition under Gerlache (1897–99), and named for Emile Guyou (1843–1915), a French mathematician who prepared a report on the magnetic results of the expedition.

See also 
 List of Antarctic and sub-Antarctic islands

References

Islands of Graham Land
Danco Coast